A blind corner or blind turn is a corner on a road where the view of what is behind the corner is obstructed. The view could for example be obstructed by buildings, hills or trees. Warning signs are often placed on such roads to warn traffic.

Vehicle-to-vehicle communication offers the possibility to reduce the risk of accidents on blind corners. Vehicles can use radio signals to see each other even when there is no line-of-sight and warn the driver. While the Obama administration made a proposal to require vehicle-to-vehicle communication for new cars and light trucks, the Trump administration has set these plans aside. An alternative method that does not depend on all vehicles having radio transmitters is the use of sensitive lasers. The light from the lasers reflects off any nearby objects like people, cars or animals and allows a computer system in the vehicle to image those objects without a line-of-sight.

For private roads or blind corners inside buildings, the UK government suggests placement of mirrors to prevent accidents.

Variants

A blind curve is similar to a blind corner, but the view is obstructed because the road is curved. A blind summit occurs on inclined roads where oncoming traffic from the other side of the hill cannot be seen.

References

External links

Road transport